Balagtas is a crater on Mercury. It has a diameter of 98 kilometers. Its name was adopted by the International Astronomical Union in 1976. Balagtas is named for the Filipino writer Francisco Balagtas, who lived from 1788 to 1862.

Kenkō crater is to the west of Balagtas, and Hitomaro is to the north.  To the southeast is Darío.

References

Impact craters on Mercury